Fils Olivier Karekezi (born 25 May 1983) is a Rwandan footballer who currently plays for Swedish side Råå IF in Division 3 Södra Götaland. He is also a former captain of the Rwanda national team.

Career

Olivier Karekezi grew up in Kigali, where he attended Rugunga primary school. He used to spend most of his time playing football at Ste Famille primary school "SAHARA" sandy playground, where he kick-started his football journey with fellow teens among others "GANGI" Hategekimana Bonaventure. They both joined APR at around the same period of time in 2002, and continued to enjoy the game together at a higher level; that was then well known as 1ère Division.

He signed for Helsingborgs IF in 2005, leaving his native club APR FC, and scored five goals in 18 matches during the 2005 season. In 2006, he scored 11 goals for Helsingborg and thereby became their top scorer in Allsvenskan. In January 2008 he transferred to Hamarkameratene. In March 2010 he joined Swedish second division club Östers IF on a two-year deal.

Karekezi took pay cut to play for his former club APR. The attacking midfielder, who has been getting US$52,000 (Rwf30.9m) a year at Swedish second division side Östers IF, has already agreed a two- year-deal with the Primus league champions in the region of US$24, 000 (Rwf14m) a year.

Towards the end of September 2012, he joined Tunisian Ligue Professionnelle 1 club CA Bizertin in a two-year deal. In July 2013, he announced that he would retire from football when his contract with Bizertin expires in March 2015. However, he joined Swedish third-tier outfit Trelleborgs FF on 22 January 2014.

International career
Karekezi made his international debut for Rwanda in 2000, and represented his country at the 2004 African Cup of Nations.

After 13 years with the national team, he announced his retirement from international football in late August 2013.

Career statistics

International
International goals
Scores and results list Rwanda's goal tally first.

References

External links

Olivier Karekezi at Footballdatabase

1983 births
Living people
People from Kigali
Rwandan footballers
Rwanda international footballers
Rwandan expatriate footballers
Association football forwards
Expatriate footballers in Sweden
Expatriate footballers in Norway
Expatriate footballers in Tunisia
Allsvenskan players
Superettan players
Eliteserien players
APR F.C. players
Helsingborgs IF players
Hamarkameratene players
CA Bizertin players
Trelleborgs FF players
2004 African Cup of Nations players
Rwandan expatriate sportspeople in Sweden
Rwandan expatriate sportspeople in Norway
Rwandan expatriate sportspeople in Tunisia